Vemagal was one of the 224 constituencies in the Karnataka Legislative Assembly of Karnataka a south state of India. It was also part of Kolar Lok Sabha constituency.

Member of Legislative Assembly

Mysore State
 1951-1967: Seat did not exist
 1967: G. N. Gowda, Indian National Congress
 1972: C. Byre Gowda, Independent

Karnataka State
 1978: S. Govinda Gowda, Indian National Congress (Indira)
 1983: C. Byre Gowda, Independent
 1985: C. Byre Gowda, Janata Party
 1989: C. Byre Gowda, Janata Party
 1994: C. Byre Gowda, Janata Dal
 1999: C. Byre Gowda, Janata Dal (United)
 2003 (By-Poll): Krishna Byre Gowda, All India Progressive Janata Dal
 2004: Krishna Byre Gowda, Indian National Congress
 2008 onwards: Seat does not exist

See also
 Kolar district
 List of constituencies of Karnataka Legislative Assembly

References

Former assembly constituencies of Karnataka
Kolar district